Cannons in the Rain is the sixth album by folk musician John Stewart, former member of the Kingston Trio. It is his first album on RCA Records.

Track listing
All compositions by John Stewart except where noted.

Side one
 "Durango" – 2:51
 "Chilly Winds" (John Stewart, John Philips)– 3:35
 "Easy Money" – 3:23
 "Anna On a Memory" – 3:02
 "All Time Woman" – 3:15
 "Road Away" – 3:10

Side two
 "Armstrong" – 2:35
 "Spirit" – 3:54
 "Wind Dies Down" – 3:31
 "Cannons in the Rain" – 3:20
 "Lady and the Outlaw" – 3:29

Personnel
 John Stewart – vocals, guitar
 Bobby Thompson - banjo
 Russ Kunkel - drums
 Charlie McCoy - harmonica
 Hargus "Pig" Robbins - piano
 Buffy Ford - backing vocals
 Pete Drake - pedal steel, resonator guitar
 The Nashville Edition - backing vocals
 Waddy Wachtel - guitar
 Kelso Herston - guitar
 Chris Darrow - mandolin
 Fred Carter Jr. - resonator guitar
 Chip Young - guitar, backing vocals
 Buck Wilkin - guitar, backing vocals
 Buddy Harman - drums
 Arnie Moore - bass

Additional personnel
Nik Venet - producer
  
Fred Carter Jr. - producer

Not Nik Venet

according to LP graphics

References

1973 albums
John Stewart (musician) albums
Albums produced by Nick Venet
RCA Records albums